Bug Tussle is an  unincorporated community in Fannin County, Texas, United States.

Bug Tussle was so named from an incident in the 1890s when a swarm of insects spoiled an ice cream social. Bug Tussle has been noted for its unusual place name.

References 

Unincorporated communities in Texas
Unincorporated communities in Fannin County, Texas
Ghost towns in East Texas